Several instances of evacuations (including both emergency evacuations and forced migrations) occurred during and after World War II.

Forced migrations
 World War II evacuation and expulsion, an overview of the major forced migrations
 Forced migration of Poles, Ukrainians, Belorussians, and Russians to Germany as forced labour
 Forced migration of Jews to Nazi concentration camps in the General Government. 
 Expulsion of Germans after World War II from areas occupied by the Red Army
 Evacuation of East Prussia
 Forced internment of Japanese Americans in internment camps, primarily in the western United States. 
 NKVD prisoner massacres

Civilian emergency evacuations
 Evacuations of civilians in Britain during World War II, the emergency evacuation of children from British urban areas during the Battle of Britain
 Evacuation of population in the Western Soviet Union in the wake of Operation Barbarossa
 Evacuation of Finnish Karelia 
 Finnish war children
 Evacuations of civilians in Japan during World War II

Military evacuations
 Operation Dynamo, British evacuation of the British Expeditionary Force from Dunkirk, France, 1940
 Operation Aerial, British evacuation of Allied forces from Western France, 1940
 Operation Cycle, British evacuation of the Beauman Division of Le Havre, France, 1940
 Operation Alphabet, British evacuation of Allied forces from Narvik, Norway, 1940
 Evacuations of Commonwealth forces from Greece and Crete during the Battle of Greece, 1941
 Evacuation for Odessa during the Siege of Odessa
 Evacuation from Crimea during the Crimea Campaign
 Evacuations during the Siege of Leningrad
 Operation Ke, Japanese evacuation from Guadalcanal, Jan-Feb 1943
 Japanese evacuation from Kiska, July 1943
 Allied invasion of Sicily, Axis evacuation order to the Royal Italian Army over the Strait of Messina to Italy, 1943
 Operation Hannibal, German evacuation of the Wehrmacht from East Prussia in advance of the Red Army, 1945
 Evacuation of Tallinn

Industrial evacuations
 Evacuation of industries from western USSR to the Urals
 Evacuation of industries from western USSR to Central Asia
 Evacuation of industries from western USSR to Kazakhstan
 Evacuation of industries from western USSR to the Caucasus

References

Evacuations
World War II